Pimelea pagophila, commonly known as Grampians rice-flower, is a species of shrub in the family Thymelaeaceae. It  has a restricted distribution, white flowers in spherical heads at the end of branches, green leaves arranged in opposite pairs and is endemic to Victoria, Australia.

Description
The inflorescence is a pendulous spherical head containing numerous individual flowers. Flowering occurs from October to November.

Taxonomy and naming
Pimelea pagophila was first formally described in 1990 by  Barbara Lynette Rye and the description was published in the Flora of Australia. The specific epithet (pagophila) is from pago meaning "hill or mountain" and philea  meaning "to love" with reference  to the habitat of the species.

Distribution
Grampians rice-flower has a restricted distribution and it is endemic to  Mount William  located within the Grampians National Park, Victoria.

Conservation status
Pimelea pagophila is considered "vulnerable" under the Environment Protection and Biodiversity Conservation Act 1999.

References

pagophila
Malvales of Australia
Victoria
Taxa named by Barbara Lynette Rye
Plants described in 1990